The Investiture of Zimri-Lim is a large colorful mural discovered at the Royal Palace of the ancient city-state of Mari in eastern Syria. The fresco, which dates back to the 18th century BC, depicts Zimri-Lim, king of Mari, receiving the rod-and-ring symbol (a ring and a staff, symbols of rule) from the goddess Ishtar. The painting was discovered in situ on its original wall located opposite the grand doorway to the podium which leads to the throne room of the palace. It was discovered by French archaeologist André Parrot during excavations at Mari in 1935–1936. The painting is now displayed at the Musée du Louvre in Paris, France.

Overview

The painting is composed of three vertical panels arranged symmetrically, with the two outer sections framing the central one. The middle panel is divided horizontally into two rectangular registers framed by six parallel lines of different colors. The painting's symmetry facilitates the reconstruction of the damaged part on the left panel.

The painting is said to reflect the actual architecture of the palace in which the mural was located. The lower register of the middle panel reflects the podium room in which the body of a statue of a goddess similar to the goddess Lama depicted in the mural was discovered. The statue had a vase from which actual water flowed. The podium room opens up to the throne room, where the investiture takes place. The palm trees depicted in the side panels represent actual trees that were planted in the palace's courtyard.

The upper register of the middle panel is the center of the mural and depicts the solemn scene of investiture. It is composed of five people standing against a blank background. Ishtar is depicted wearing her divine crown, with weapons sprouting from her shoulders and a sickle-sword in her left hand, and presenting the king with the rod-and-ring symbol. The king is extending his left hand to the goddess, while his right hand is depicted against his mouth in a symbol of prayer. On either side of the king and Ishtar stands a Lama deity, the minor goddess of intercession in Mesopotamia, wearing a horned headdress. To the right stands Ninshubur, the vassal of Ishtar.

The lower register is symmetrical, and symbolizes the fertility and prosperity of the coming reign of Zimri-Lim. It shows the goddess Lama dispensing water from a round vase. Plants are shown sprouting from the vase, and fish swimming in the flowing stream.

The outer panels depict a garden of palms and another mythical tree with a red trunk and blue leaves. A Lama deity is standing in the garden, on either side of the central scene, and raising her hands in prayer. Three mythic animals, a lion, a sphinx and a bull with a human head, are depicted each on a ground line. The animals are symmetrically placed on each side, and are turned towards the central scene in the painting. Flying doves, which symbolize the pacific aspects of Ishtar, counterbalance the lion which symbolizes her aggression.

The symbols and iconography of the mural are often compared to the figures atop the Stele of Hammurabi.

Restoration
The fresco was poorly preserved due to the region's conditions and the destruction of the palace in the fire when Hammurabi sacked the city in  1760 BC. The painting underwent several restorations and repainting, most of which was cleared recently by the Louvre. The cleaning revealed several details hitherto unseen, including the fish in the dispensed water. It also restored some brilliance to the colors of the painting.

Gallery

See also

 Art of Mesopotamia
 Statue of Ebih-Il
 Statue of Iddi-Ilum

References

Citations

Bibliography

18th-century BC works
1935 archaeological discoveries
Fresco paintings in France
Syrian art
Near East and Middle East antiquities of the Louvre
Archaeological discoveries in Mari, Syria
Sumerian art and architecture
Hammurabi
Paintings in the collection of the Louvre